The National Honours and Awards is a national awards ceremony that honours Ghanaian people who have rendered distinguished services to Ghana in various fields and careers. The ceremony is held on 30 June every year in Ghana.

History
The maiden ceremony was held in 1960 when Ghana became a republic under the  auspices of the country's first president, Kwame Nkrumah. It remained a low key event until 2006 when President John Agyekum Kufour instituted 30 June every year as National Honours Day.

The awards
There are five distinct awards that a recipient is given:
Order of the Star and Eagles of Ghana
Order of the Star of Ghana 
Order of the Volta 
The Medal for Gallantry
The Grand Medal

See also
Orders, decorations, and medals of Ghana

References

Government of Ghana
Orders, decorations, and medals of Ghana